N. E. Weerasooria  (1 January 1895 – 15 May 1974) was an eminent Sri Lankan lawyer. 

Educated at Royal College Colombo, where he edited the College Magazine and at the Ceylon Law College. He gained prominence as a lawyer being appointed  in 1938 as one of the youngest King's Counsel in Sri Lanka, and as a historian authoring several books on Sri Lanka. 

In the 1953 he was appointed to chair the Commission of Broadcasting and in the early 1960s he was the founding Chairmen of the Ceylon Petroleum Corporation in the 1960s.

He used the pen-name "Fijjik".

Selected publications
 Tales of Old Ceylon (1963) (4 vols.)
 Modern Ceylon Through the Looking Glass (1965)
 Ceylon and her People
 Ran Kumari - A Golden Princess of the Kandyan Hills

References

External links
Burdens for the people: Where are we heading?

Sinhalese lawyers
Alumni of Royal College, Colombo
Alumni of Sri Lanka Law College
Ceylonese Queen's Counsel
Historians of Sri Lanka
Sinhalese writers
1974 deaths